John Willard "Bill" Marriott Jr. (born March 25, 1932) is an American billionaire businessman who is the executive chairman of Marriott International, of which he owns 11.28%.

Early life and education
Marriott was born in Washington, D.C., the son of Alice Marriott and J. Willard Marriott, the founder of Marriott Corporation. He attended St. Albans School in Washington, D.C. He is also an Eagle Scout and recipient of the Distinguished Eagle Scout Award.

When he was 14, Marriott worked for his dad stapling invoices. He later washed dishes and cooked burgers.

In 1954, Marriott earned a Bachelor of Science degree in finance from the University of Utah, where he was a member of the Sigma Chi fraternity. There, he met his wife, the daughter of a professor.

Upon graduating, Marriott went to a Navy training school in Georgia. From June 1954 to 1956, he served on the USS Randolph aircraft carrier as a wardroom mess officer in the Navy Supply Corps.

When Marriott was 22 years old, in 1954, Dwight D. Eisenhower and his wife, Mamie Eisenhower, were dinner guests of his father. Marriott was impressed by Eisenhower's style of inclusive decision making and carried this style later in his career.

In June 1955, Marriott was married at the Salt Lake Temple in Salt Lake City.

Career
Marriott joined Marriott Corporation in 1956. He pushed his father, who was wary of taking on debt after experiencing the Great Depression, to expand from the restaurant business into the hotel business.

Marriott was elected executive vice president and member of the board of directors in January 1964, president of the company in November 1964, chief executive officer in 1972, and chairman of the board in 1985. He introduced the practice of revenue management to the hotel industry.

Effective March 31, 2012, Marriott assumed the role of executive chairman of the company and relinquished the role of chief executive officer to Arne Sorenson.

Awards
In 2001, Marriott was recognized as The Industry Leader of The Year by Broad College of Business, Michigan State University.

On May 4, 2006, Marriott received an honorary doctorate of humanities from Weber State University and delivered the commencement speech.

On April 2, 2008, Marriott received the International Association of Business Communicators' Excellence in Communication Leadership Award.

On June 2, 2009, Marriott received the Icon of the Industry award from Cornell University School of Hotel Administration.

In 2010, Marriott received the Foreign Language Advocacy Award from the Northeast Conference on the Teaching of Foreign Languages in recognition of programs that provided language instruction to both non-English speaking and English speaking employees.

On November 19, 2016, Ernst & Young named Marriott the National/Overall Entrepreneur of the Year.

In 2018, Marriott received the Distinguished Service Award by the National Maritime Historical Society.

Personal life
Marriott has been married to Donna Garff for over 60 years and they have four children, all of whom work for Marriott International, fifteen grandchildren, and twenty great-grandchildren. They raised their kids in a brick ranch-style house in Bethesda, Maryland.

In an episode of 60 Minutes aired on April 7, 1996, Marriott was interviewed by Mike Wallace.

In 2018, Bill's son John Marriott III sued both him and his uncle, Richard Marriott, for allegedly cutting John out of the family fortune, in part for divorcing his wife without approval of his father. The lawsuit was settled out of court.

Religion
Marriott is an active member of the Church of Jesus Christ of Latter-day Saints. Since 1978, the Marriotts have been supporters of the annual Festival of Lights on the grounds of the Washington D.C. Temple. In 1997, Marriott was called by the church to be an Area Authority Seventy and member of the Fifth Quorum of the Seventy. This was split in 2004 and Marriott joined the newly-created Sixth Quorum of the Seventy, serving until his release on October 1, 2011.

Boards
Marriott is actively involved in various boards and councils including, the U.S. Travel and Tourism Promotional Advisory Board, the executive committee of the World Travel and Tourism Council, the National Business Council, the board of trustees of the National Urban League, a director of the National Geographic Society, and a director of the Naval Academy Endowment Trust. He serves as chairman of the President's Export Council, a group that advises the president on matters relating to export trade, and serves as chairman of the Leadership Council of the Laura Bush Foundation for America's Libraries.

Bibliography
 Without Reservations: How a Family Root Beer Stand Grew into a Global Hotel Company Luxury Custom Publishing LLC, May 1, 2013

References

1932 births
American leaders of the Church of Jesus Christ of Latter-day Saints
American chairpersons of corporations
Area seventies (LDS Church)
Latter Day Saints from Washington, D.C.
Living people
Marriott International people
People from Potomac, Maryland
People from Washington, D.C.
St. Albans School (Washington, D.C.) alumni
United States Navy officers
David Eccles School of Business alumni
Weber State University people